Edy Paul (born 8 May 1951) is a Swiss retired slalom canoeist who competed in the 1970s. He finished 22nd in the C-1 event at the 1972 Summer Olympics in Munich.

External links

1951 births
Canoeists at the 1972 Summer Olympics
Living people
Olympic canoeists of Switzerland
Swiss male canoeists
Place of birth missing (living people)
20th-century Swiss people